White cushion fleabane is a common name for several plants native to the western United States and may refer to:

Erigeron disparipilus
Erigeron robustior